Gualtiero Piccinini (born 1970) is an Italian–American philosopher known for his work on the nature of mind and computation as well as on how to integrate psychology and neuroscience. He is Curators' Distinguished Professor in the Philosophy Department and Associate Director of the Center for Neurodynamics at the University of Missouri, St. Louis.

Background
Piccinini was born and raised in Italy, and studied philosophy and cognitive science at the University of Turin, from which he earned a Bachelor of Arts, and graduated cum laude. He then went to graduate school at University of Pittsburgh, specializing in the history and philosophy of science. Upon completion of his Ph.D. in 2003, he held the position of  "James S. McDonnell Post Doctoral Research Fellow" at the PNP (Philosophy, Neuroscience, and Psychology) program at Washington University in St. Louis. He started as an assistant professor at the University of Missouri, St. Louis, in 2005 and received early tenure and promotion to associate professor in 2010 and early promotion to full professor in 2014. From 2011 to 2014 he was the Chair of the Philosophy Department at the university.

Piccinini has served as a visiting professor several times in his career, including at Washington University in St. Louis in spring 2015, a fellow at Institute for Advanced Studies at the Hebrew University of Jerusalem in May 2011, and finally as a Visiting Assistant Professor at the engineering graduate school of the Polytechnic University of Turin both in May 2007 and 2009.

Work
Piccinini specializes in theories of Neuroscience, Computation, Psychology and the human Mind. An overview of his work in these areas is below.

Cognitive science
In the area of cognitive science Piccinini is best known for his mechanistic account of what it takes for a physical system to perform computations.  He has argued that computation is a kind of mechanistic process that does not require representation.  Building on his account of computation, he and co-author Sonya Bahar, a physicist and Director of the Center for Neurodynamics at University of Missouri, St. Louis, argue that neural computations are neither digital nor analog, but sui generis.

Philosophy of mind
Piccinini is also widely known for his critique of pancomputationalism and for his view about first-person data such as data from first-person reports.  He has argued that first-person data are scientifically legitimate because they are public like other scientific data. Piccinini has also published influential articles on computational theories of cognition, concepts, and consciousness, with award-winning physicist Sonya Bahar and his post doc and research associate Corey Maley from Princeton University, among others.

In 2020, he published the book Neurocognitive Mechanisms, in which he develops a neurocomputational explanation of cognition.

Miscellaneous
Piccinini has received several grants, awards, fellowships and teaching releases, including two Scholars' Awards by the National Science Foundation. He is the recipient of the 2014 Herbert Simon award by the International Association of Computing and Philosophy.

He has been Philosophy Program Chair for the Southern Society for Philosophy and Psychology.

He is the founder of Brains, an academic group blog in the philosophy of mind, psychology, and neuroscience and one of the founders of SLAPSA, a St. Louis-based organization for the philosophy of science, run by Piccinini, Professor Carl Craver (Washington University in St. Louis) and Professor Kent Staley (Saint Louis University). He administered the blog until 2012.

Piccinini has edited multiple academic journals, including: Cognitive Science, Humanities, Journal of Cognitive Science, and The Rutherford Journal. He is also Editor-in-chief of "Studies in Brain and Mind", a Springer book series. He has held this position since 2010.

Piccinini and his spouse, Mich Ciurria, are members of The Ethical Society of St. Louis.

Bibliography
This is only a partial list of publications by Gualtiero Piccinini. A full list is viewable on the "Published Articles" section of his Curriculum Vitae, viewable here. 
 
 
“Information Processing, Computation, and Cognition” (with Andrea Scarantino).  Journal of Biological Physics, 37.1 (2011), pp. 1–38.
 
 “Computation in Physical Systems,” The Stanford Encyclopedia of Philosophy.(Fall 2010 Edition), Edward N. Zalta (ed.).
 “First-Person Data, Publicity, and Self-Measurement.” Philosophers’ Imprint, 9.9 (2009), pp. 1–16.
 
 
“A Unified Mechanistic Account of Teleological Functions for Psychology and Neuroscience” (with Corey J. Maley), in David Kaplan (ed.), Integrating Psychology and Neuroscience: Prospects and Problems, Oxford: Oxford University Press (forthcoming). 10,600 words.
“The Computational Theory of Cognition,” in V. C. Müller (ed.), Fundamental Issues of Artificial Intelligence (Synthese Library), Berlin: Springer (forthcoming). 8,300 words.

References

Sources
"Gualtiero Piccinini's Homepage". St. Louis: University of Missouri. 10 March 2010. Retrieved 31 December 2012.
 
 
Chalmers, D., The Character of Consciousness, Oxford University Press (2010), p. 53

External links
List of Piccinini’s Works at University of Missouri – St. Louis
Brains, a group blog in the philosophy of mind and cognitive science

21st-century American philosophers
University of Missouri–St. Louis faculty
Philosophers of mind
20th-century American philosophers
Living people
Consciousness researchers and theorists
1970 births
Analytic philosophers
University of Turin alumni
University of Pittsburgh alumni
Washington University in St. Louis faculty
Academic staff of the Hebrew University of Jerusalem
Academic staff of the Polytechnic University of Turin